AS-202 (also referred to as SA-202) was the second uncrewed, suborbital test flight of a production Block I Apollo command and service module launched with the Saturn IB launch vehicle. It was launched on August 25, 1966, and was the first flight which included the spacecraft guidance, navigation control system and fuel cells. The success of this flight enabled the Apollo program to judge the Block I spacecraft and Saturn IB ready to carry men into orbit on the next mission, AS-204.

Objectives
AS-202 was the third test flight of the Saturn IB, because a delay in the readiness of the Apollo spacecraft 011 pushed its launch past the July 1966 launch of AS-203. It was designed to test the rocket more than had been done on AS-201 by launching the rocket higher and having the flight lasting twice as long. It would also test the command and service module (CSM-011) by having the engine fire four times during the flight.

The flight was also designed to test the heat shield by subjecting it to 260 megajoules per square meter. Over the course of the reentry it generated equivalent energy needed to power Los Angeles for over one minute in 1966.

CSM-011 was basically a production model capable of carrying a crew. However it lacked the crew couches and some displays that would be included on later missions for the astronauts. This was the first flight of the guidance and navigation system as well as the fuel cell electrical system.

Flight
AS-202 was launched 25 August 1966 from Pad 34. The second stage then burned for a further seven and a half minutes, putting the spacecraft into a ballistic trajectory.

The CSM was preprogrammed to make four burns of its service propulsion system (SPS). The first occurred a couple of seconds after separation from the S-IVB second stage.

The second burn was 25 minutes later, lasting one minute 28 seconds. Ten seconds later, two more burns of three seconds each were done to test the rapid restart capabilities of the engine.

By this time it had shed  of speed. It then continued to descend. It splashed down at 16.12° N - 168.9° E,  from the target landing site, and the aircraft carrier  took 8 hours and 30 minutes to reach the capsule (SouthEast of Wake Island).

Staging footage

AS-202 was one of three uncrewed Apollo missions which obtained notable close-up footage of a Saturn rocket during staging, the others being Apollo 4 and Apollo 6.  Ejectable cameras were mounted to each launch vehicle, technology first developed for the Saturn I.  On AS-202, a camera was mounted to the Saturn IB vehicle's first stage, the S-IB, looking forward.  It captured footage of the vehicle's second stage, the S-IVB (200 series) pulling away and firing its single J-2 engine.  The upper stage is identifiable by its firing of three ullage motors; a later iteration of the S-IVB, the 500 series, had only two ullage motors, and was that used on Saturn V launches.

Although the footage was captured during an uncrewed flight, it is frequently used as stock footage in documentaries of crewed flights, to illustrate staging.  The footage was used in the documentary film Apollo 11, and is sometimes erroneously attributed to Apollo 11, or other crewed missions.

Museum display

The capsule is currently on display aboard . The ship is open to the public as the USS Hornet Museum in Alameda, California.

References

External links

 Postlaunch report for mission AS-202 (Apollo spacecraft 011) – Oct 1966 NASA (PDF format)
 NASA Space Science Data Coordinated Archive
 Moonport: A History of Apollo Launch Facilities and Operations http://www.hq.nasa.gov/office/pao/History/SP-4204/cover.html
 Chariots for Apollo: A History of Manned Lunar Spacecraft http://www.hq.nasa.gov/office/pao/History/SP-4205/cover.html
 AS-202 Press Kit: https://web.archive.org/web/20031205112335/http://www.apollosaturn.com/as202/as202con.htm

Apollo 03
1966 in spaceflight
Spacecraft launched by Saturn rockets